Patella rustica, the Lusitanian limpet or rustic limpet is a species of sea snail, a true limpet, a marine gastropod mollusk in the family Patellidae, one of the families of true limpets. It is a rocky shore intertidal mollusc found throughout the Mediterranean and the north-east Atlantic from Mauritania to southern France.

Description

Distribution

References

 Linnaeus, C. (1758). Systema Naturae per regna tria naturae, secundum classes, ordines, genera, species, cum characteribus, differentiis, synonymis, locis. Editio decima, reformata. Laurentius Salvius: Holmiae. ii, 824 pp

External links

Somali.asso.fr: Patella rustica

Patellidae
Molluscs of the Mediterranean Sea
Marine molluscs of Europe
Marine molluscs of Africa
Gastropods described in 1758
Taxa named by Carl Linnaeus